Chunati Union is a Union of Lohagara Upazila, Chittagong District, Bangladesh.

Information

Local Government
Chairman
 Mohammad Zoynul Abedin

Area
The union total area is 61.22km

Points of Interest

 
 Chunati Wildlife Sanctuary

http://chunatiup.chittagong.gov.bd/officialwebsite]

References

Unions of Lohagara Upazila, Chittagong